The Labroidei are a suborder of the Perciformes, the largest order of fish. Among others, the suborder includes the wrasses, cichlids, and parrotfish.

Timeline of genera

See also
 Labriformes

References

 

 
Ray-finned fish suborders